Corinna is an extinct genus of diatoms of uncertain placement within Bacillariophyceae (incertae sedis). C. elegans is from the Cretaceous of Canada.

References

External links 
 
 
 Corinna at the World Register of Marine Species (WoRMS)
 

†
Prehistoric SAR supergroup genera
Diatoms